Emden Airport  is an airfield serving Emden, a city in the East Frisia region of the German state of Lower Saxony.

Facilities

Airlines and destinations

The following airlines offer regular scheduled and charter flights at Emden Airport:

See also
 Transport in Germany
 List of airports in Germany

References

External links
 Official website
 

Airports in Lower Saxony